Mohican (also known as Mahican, not to be confused with Mohegan) is a language of the Eastern Algonquian subgroup of the Algonquian language family, itself a member of the Algic language family. It was spoken in the territory of present-day eastern New York state and Vermont by the Mohican people but is believed to have gone extinct for seven decades. However, since the late 2010s, the language is being revived, with adults learning the language, and children being raised having Mohican as their first language.

History 
Aboriginally, speakers of Mohican lived along the upper Hudson River in New York State, extending as far north as Lake Champlain, east to the Green Mountains in Vermont, and west near Schoharie Creek in New York State. Conflict with the Mohawk of the Iroquois Confederacy in competition for the fur trade, and European encroachment, triggered displacement of the Mohicans, some moving to west-central New York, where they shared land with the Oneida. After a series of dislocations, some Mohicans were forced to relocate to Wisconsin in the 1820s and 1830s, while others moved to several communities in Canada, where they lost their Mohican identity.

The Mohican language became extinct in the early twentieth century, with the last recorded documentation of Mahican made in the 1930s.

Dialects 

Two distinct Mohican dialects have been identified, Moravian and Stockbridge. These two dialects emerged after 1740 as aggregations arising from the dislocation of Mohican and other groups.  The extent of Mohican dialect variation prior to this period is uncertain.

The Stockbridge dialect emerged at Stockbridge, Massachusetts, and included groups of New York Mohican, and members of other linguistic groups such as Wappinger (a once-large Munsee-speaking tribe south of the Mohican), Housatonic, Wawyachtonoc, and others. After a complex migration history, the Stockbridge group moved to Wisconsin, where they combined with Munsee Lenape migrants from southwestern Ontario. They are now known as the Stockbridge-Munsee tribe.

The Moravian dialect arose from population aggregations centred at Bethlehem, Pennsylvania. Some Mohican groups that had been affiliated from about 1740 with the Moravian Church, in New York and Connecticut, moved in 1746 to Bethlehem. Another group affiliated with the Moravians moved to Wyoming, Pennsylvania. Subsequent to several members being massacred by white settlers, some members of these groups fled to Canada with Munsee Moravian converts, ultimately settling at what is now Moraviantown, where they have completely merged with the dominant Lenape population. Another group moved to Ohsweken at Six Nations, Ontario, where they merged with other groups at that location.

Phonology and documentation 

Mohican linguistic materials consist of a variety of materials collected by missionaries, linguists, and others, including an eighteenth-century manuscript dictionary compiled by Johann Schmick, a Moravian missionary. In the twentieth century, linguists Truman Michelson and Morris Swadesh collected some Mohican materials from surviving speakers in Wisconsin.

Mohican historical phonology has been studied based upon the Schmick dictionary manuscript, tracing the historical changes affecting the pronunciation of words between Proto-Algonquian and the Moravian dialect of Mohican, as reflected in Schmick’s dictionary. The similarities between Mohican and the Delaware languages Munsee and Unami have been acknowledged in studies of Mohican linguistic history. In one classification Mohican and the Delaware languages are assigned to a Delawaran subgroup of Eastern Algonquian.

Vowel sounds

Examples of Mohican words 
The table below presents a sample of Mohican words, written first in a linguistically oriented transcription, followed by the same words written in a practical system that has been used in the linguistically related dialect of Munsee. The linguistic system uses a raised dot (·) to indicate vowel length. Although stress is mostly predictable, the linguistic system uses the acute accent to indicate predictable main stress. As well, predictable voiceless or murmured  is indicated with the breve accent (˘). Similarly, the breve accent is used to indicate an ultra-short  that typically occurs before a single voiced consonant followed by a vowel. The practical system indicates vowel length by doubling the vowel letter, and maintains the linɡuistic system's practices for marking stress and voiceless/ultra-short vowels.

See also
 Mohicans
 Stockbridge-Munsee Community

Notes

References
 Joh. Jac. Schmick, Miscellanea linguae nationis Indicae Mahikan, American Philosophical Society Archives.
 Brasser, Ted. 1978. "Mahican." Bruce Trigger, ed., Handbook of North American Indians, Volume 15, Northeast, pp. 198–212. Washington:  Smithsonian Institution. OCLC 26140074
 Campbell, Lyle. 1997. American Indian languages: The historical linguistics of Native America. New York: Oxford University Press. .
 Campbell, Lyle; & Mithun, Marianne, eds. 1979. The languages of native America: Historical and comparative assessment. Austin: University of Texas Press. .
 Campbell, Lyle; & Mithun, Marianne. (979. "Introduction: North American Indian historical linguistics in current perspective." In L. Campbell & M. Mithun, eds., The languages of native America: Historical and comparative assessment, pp. 3–69. Austin: University of Texas Press. 
 Goddard, Ives.  1978.  "Eastern Algonquian Languages." Bruce Trigger, ed., Handbook of North American Indians, Volume 15, Northeast, pp. 70–77. Washington:  Smithsonian Institution.
 Goddard, Ives. 1996. "Introduction." Ives Goddard, ed., The Handbook of North American Indians, Volume 17. Languages, pp. 1–16. Washington, D.C.: The Smithsonian Institution. OCLC 26140074
 Goddard, Ives. 1999. Native languages and language families of North America (rev. and enlarged ed. with additions and corrections). [Map]. Lincoln, NE: University of Nebraska Press (Smithsonian Institution). (Updated version of the map in Goddard 1996). .
Goddard, Ives. 2009. Notes on Mahican: Dialects, Sources, Phonemes, Enclitics, and Analogies. In Karl Hele and Regna Darnell (eds.), Papers of the 39th Algonquian Conference, 246-315. London, Ontario: The University of Western Ontario.
 Masthay, Carl, ed. Schmick's Mahican Dictionary. Philadelphia: American Philosophical Society. 
 Michelson, Truman. 1914. ["Notes on the Stockbridge Language."] Manuscript No. 2734, National Anthropological Archives. Smithsonian Institution. Washington, DC
 Mithun, Marianne. (1999). The languages of Native North America. Cambridge: Cambridge University Press.  (hbk);  (pbk).
 Pentland, David. 1992. "Mahican historical phonology." Carl Masthay, ed. Schmick's Mahican Dictionary, pp. 15–27. Philadelphia: American Philosophical Society.

External links
 Mohican Language Resource
 Stockbridge-Munsee Community
 OLAC resources in and about the Mohican language

Eastern Algonquian languages
Languages of the United States
Extinct languages of North America
Languages extinct in the 1940s